Virgin Interactive Entertainment (later renamed Avalon Interactive) was the video game publishing division of British conglomerate the Virgin Group. It developed and published games for major platforms and employed developers, including Westwood Studios co-founder Brett Sperry and Earthworm Jim creators David Perry and Doug TenNapel. Others include video game composer Tommy Tallarico and animators Bill Kroyer and Andy Luckey.

Formed as Virgin Games in 1983, and built around a small development team called the Gang of Five, the company grew significantly after purchasing budget label Mastertronic in 1987. As Virgin's video game division grew into a multimedia powerhouse, it crossed over to other industries from toys to film to education. To highlight its focus beyond video games and on multimedia, the publisher was renamed Virgin Interactive Entertainment in 1993.

As result of a growing trend throughout the 1990s of media companies, movie studios and telecom firms investing in video game makers to create new forms of entertainment, VIE became part of the entertainment industry after being acquired by media companies Blockbuster and Viacom, who were attracted by its multimedia and CD-ROM-based software development. 
Being located in close proximity to the thirty-mile zone and having access to the media content of its parent companies drew Virgin Interactive's U.S. division closer to Hollywood as it began developing sophisticated interactive games, leading to partnerships with Disney and other major studios on motion picture-based games such as The Lion King, Aladdin, RoboCop and The Terminator, in addition to being the publisher of popular titles from other companies like Capcom's Resident Evil series and Street Fighter Collection and id Software's Doom II in the European market.

VIE ceased to exist in mid-2003 after being acquired by French publisher Titus Software who rebranded them to Avalon Interactive in July of that year. The VIE library and intellectual properties are owned by Interplay Entertainment as a result of its acquisition of Titus. A close affiliate and successor of Spanish origin, Virgin Play, was formed in 2002 from the ashes of former Virgin Interactive's Spanish division and kept operating until it folded in 2009.

History

Early history (1983-1987)
Nick Alexander formed Virgin Games in 1983 after leaving Thorn EMI. It was headquartered in Portobello Road, London. The firm initially relied on submissions by freelancer developers, but set up its own in-house development team in 1984, known as the Gang of Five. Early successes included Sorcery and Dan Dare. The company expanded with the acquisition of several smaller publishers, Rabbit Software, New Generation Software and Leisure Genius (publishers of the first officially licensed computer versions of Scrabble, Monopoly and Cluedo).

Purchase of Mastertronic and rebranding to Virgin Mastertronic (1987-1991)
1987 marked a turning point for Virgin after its acquisition of struggling distributor Mastertronic. Mastertronic had opened its North American headquarters in Irvine, California just a year earlier to build on its success at home, though growth exhausted its resources after expanding in Europe and acquiring publisher Melbourne House. Richard Branson stepped in and offered to buy 45 percent of Mastertronic stake, in exchange Mastertronic joined the Virgin Group.
The subsequent merger created Virgin Mastertronic Ltd. in 1988 with Alper as its president which enabled Virgin to expand its business reach overseas. Mastertronic had been the distributor of the Master System in the United Kingdom and is credited with introducing Sega to the European market, where they expanded rapidly. The Mastertronic acquisition enabled Virgin to compete with Nintendo in the growing home console market.

Return to publishing (1991-1993)
To gain a foothold in its newly established market, Sega Enterprises, Ltd. acquired Mastertronic in 1991 while Virgin retained a small publishing unit, which was renamed Virgin Interactive Entertainment in 1993.

Hasbro, who had previously licensed some of its properties to Virgin, bought 15 percent—later increased to 16.2 percent—stake in VIE in August 1993. Hasbro wanted to create titles based on its brands, which included Transformers, G.I. Joe and Monopoly. The deal cut off competitors like Mattel and Fisher-Price who were interested in a similar partnership. 

In late 1993, Virgin Interactive spun off a new company, Virgin Sound and Vision, to focus exclusively on CD-based children's entertainment.

Purchase by Blockbuster Entertainment and Spelling Entertainment (1994-1998)
As more media companies became interested in interactive entertainment, Blockbuster Entertainment, then the world's largest video-store chain, acquired 20 percent of Virgin Interactive Entertainment in January 1994. It acquired 75 percent of VIE's stock later in 1994 and purchased the remaining shares held by Hasbro in an effort to expand beyond its video store base. Hasbro went on to found their own game company, Hasbro Interactive the following year. The partnership with Blockbuster ended a year later when Blockbuster sold its stake to Spelling Entertainment, at the time being a subsidiary of Viacom. Viacom is the owner of Paramount Pictures and MTV, which made Virgin Interactive part of one of the world's largest entertainment companies. Viacom had planned to sell Spelling and buy Virgin Interactive out of Spelling before the sale. While it abandoned the Spelling sale some time ago, the collapse in the games market appears to have killed off any interest in buying Virgin.

Blockbuster and Viacom invested heavily in the production of CD-based interactive multimedia—video games featuring sophisticated motion-picture video, stereo sound and computer animation. VIE's headquarters were expanded to include 17 production studios where expensive SGI “graphics supercomputers” were used to build increasingly complicated games, eventually becoming one of the five largest U.S.-based video game companies.

In 1995, VIE signed a deal with Capcom to publish its titles in Europe, supplanting Acclaim Entertainment as Capcom's designated European distributor. VIE later published titles released by other companies, such as Hudson Soft.

Re-independence and purchase of US operations by Electronic Arts (1998-1999)

Spelling put its ownership of Virgin up for sale as a public stock offering in 1997, stating that Virgin's financial performance had been disappointing. Since Spelling's purchase of the company, Virgin had lost $14 million in 1995 and was expected to post similar losses for 1996.

In 1998, Virgin Interactive's US operations were divested to Electronic Arts as part of its $122.5 million (£75 million) acquisition of Westwood Studios that same year. Electronic Arts also acquired the Burst Studios development studio, which was renamed to Westwood Pacific by its new owners.

The European division though was put out in a majority stake buyout backed by Mark Dyne, who became its Chief Executive Officer in the same year. Tim Chaney, the former Managing Director was named president.

Purchase by Interplay and Titus (1999-2002)

On February 17, 1999, Interplay Entertainment purchased a 49.9% minority interest in the company, allowing Interplay to distribute Virgin's titles in North America and Virgin distributing Interplay's titles in Europe. In October of that year, Titus Interactive acquired a 50.1% majority interest in VIE after the company acquired a majority interest in Interplay.

In 2001, Titus Software Corporation, the North American division of Titus Interactive, announced a new line of games to be branded under the Virgin Interactive name in North America, which were to be sold at a budget price of $20. These games would be Screamer 4x4, Codename: Outbreak, Original War, Jimmy White's Cueball World and Nightstone. This would be the first time since 1998 that the Virgin Interactive name would be used for publishing in the country, excluding the North American release of Jimmy White's 2: Cueball, which was handled by Bay Area Multimedia.

Acquisition by Titus, sale of Spanish operations, rebranding, and fate (2002-2006)
In early 2002, as part of Titus Interactive's buyout of Interplay's European operations, Interplay's shares in Virgin Interactive were sold to Titus, which made the company a 100% owned subsidiary of Titus Software. Virgin Interactive ceased publishing their own games soon afterwards, and become solely a video game distributor for Titus and Interplay's titles.

In June 2002, Titus accepted the MBO (management buyout) of Virgin Interactive's Spanish operations by Tim Chaney but would continue to distribute Titus' titles in the region. With this, the company was out of Titus' hands and was rebranded as Virgin Play in October of that year. On July 1, 2003, Virgin Interactive's British and French operations were renamed to Avalon Interactive and Avalon France by Titus, respectively.

In January 2005, Titus Interactive filed for bankruptcy with €33 million ($43.8 million) debt. Avalon France and all of Titus' French operations were closed down immediately, while the UK branch continued to trade as Titus’ non-French operations were unaffected. Avalon Interactive was eventually closed by May 2006.

Games
Falcon Patrol (1983)
Falcon Patrol II (1984)
Sorcery (1984)
The Biz (1984)
Strangeloop (1985)
Doriath (1985)
Gates of Dawn (1985)
Hunter Patrol (1985)
Now Games compilation series (1985–1988)
Dan Dare: Pilot of the Future (1986)
Shogun (1986)
Action Force (1987)
Action Force II (1988)
Clue: Master Detective (1989)
Double Dragon II (European computer versions) (1989)
Risk: The World Conquest Game, The Computer Edition of (1989)
Silkworm (1989)
Golden Axe (European computer versions) (1990)
Conflict: Middle East Political Simulator (1990)
Supremacy: Your Will Be Done (Overlord) (1990)
Spot: The Video Game (1990)
Wonderland (1990)
Chuck Rock (1991)
Robin Hood: Prince of Thieves (1991)
Corporation (1991)
Jimmy White's Whirlwind Snooker (1991)
Realms (1991)
Alien 3 (American Amiga version) (1992)
Prince of Persia (American NES version) (1992)
Dune (1992)
Dune II (1992)
Archer McLean's Pool (1992)
European Club Soccer (1992)
Floor 13 (1992)
Global Gladiators (1992)
The Terminator (1992)
M.C. Kids (1992)
Monopoly Deluxe (1992)
Jeep Jamboree: Off Road Adventure (1992)
Cannon Fodder (1993)
Chuck Rock II: Son of Chuck (1993)
Superman: The Man of Steel (Europe only) (1993)
Dino Dini's Goal (1993)
Dragon: The Bruce Lee Story (1993)
Lands of Lore: The Throne of Chaos (1993)
Reach for the Skies (1993)
The 7th Guest (1993)
Cool Spot (1993)
Chi Chi's Pro Challenge Golf (1993)
Super Slam Dunk (1993)
Super Caesars Palace (1993)
Super Slap Shot (1993)
Disney's Aladdin (1993)
RoboCop Versus The Terminator (1993/1994)
The Terminator (Sega CD version) (1993)
Cannon Fodder 2 (1994)
Doom II: Hell on Earth (European PC version only) (1994)
Earthworm Jim (Europe only) (1994)
Jammit (America only) (1994)
Super Dany (Europe only) (1994)
Super Bomberman 2 (Europe only) (1994)
Beneath a Steel Sky (1994)
Walt Disney's The Jungle Book (1994)
Dynamaite: The Las Vegas (1994)
The Lion King (1994)
Demolition Man (1994)
Battle Jockey (1994)
The 11th Hour (1995)
Creature Shock (1995)
Earthworm Jim 2 (Europe only) (1995)
Super Bomberman 3 (Europe only) (1995)
Spot Goes To Hollywood (American Mega Drive/Genesis version published by Acclaim Entertainment) (1995)
Cyberia 2: Resurrection (1995)
The Daedalus Encounter (1995)
F1 Challenge (1995)
Flight Unlimited (1995)
Hyper 3-D Pinball (1995)
SuperKarts (1995)
Zone Raiders (1995)
Sensible Golf (1995)
Lost Eden (1995)
Kyle Petty's No Fear Racing (1995)
Command & Conquer (1995)
Gurume Sentai Barayarō (1995)
World Masters Golf (1995)
Rendering Ranger: R2 (1995)
Agile Warrior F-111X (1995)
Lone Soldier (Japan only) (1996)
The Mask (Japan only) (1996)
Resident Evil (Europe and PC versions only) (1996)
Ghen War (Europe/Japan) (1996)
NHL Powerplay '96 (1996)
Street Fighter Alpha 2 (Europe only) (1996)
Time Commando (Japan only) (1996)
Broken Sword: The Shadow of the Templars (1996)
Command & Conquer: Red Alert (1996)
Disney's Pinocchio (1996)
Queensrÿche's Promised Land (1996)
Toonstruck (1996)
Slamscape (European PS1 version) (1996)
Super Puzzle Fighter II Turbo (PS1 and Saturn versions, Europe only) (1996)
Golden Nugget (1997)
Grand Slam (1997)
Subspace (1997)
Agent Armstrong (1997)
Black Dawn (1997)
Blam! Machinehead (Japan only) (1997)
CrimeWave (Japan only) (1997)
Marvel Super Heroes (Europe only) (1997)
NanoTek Warrior (1997)
Lands of Lore: Guardians of Destiny (1997)
Broken Sword II: The Smoking Mirror (1997)
Mega Man X3 (PS1 and Saturn versions, Europe only) (1997)
NHL Powerplay '98 (1997)
 Sabre Ace: Conflict Over Korea (1997)
Ignition (1997)
Bloody Roar (Europe only) (1998)
Bomberman GB (Europe only) (1998)
Magic & Mayhem (Europe only) (1998)
R-Types (Europe only) (1998)
Rival Schools: United by Fate (Europe only) (1998)
Resident Evil 2 (Europe only) (1998)
Street Fighter Collection 2 (European publishing rights only) (1999)
Bloody Roar 2 (European publishing rights only) (1999)
Bomberman (European publishing rights only) (1999)
Bomberman Quest (European publishing rights only) (1999)
Capcom Generations (Europe only) (1999)
Kagero: Deception II (European publishing rights only) (1999)
Dino Crisis (European publishing rights only) (1999)
Holy Magic Century (European publishing rights only) (1999)
Street Fighter EX2 Plus (European publishing rights only) (1999)
Marvel Super Heroes vs. Street Fighter (European publishing rights only) (1999)
Street Fighter Alpha: Warriors' Dreams (European publishing rights only) (1999)
Marvel vs. Capcom: Clash of Super Heroes (European publishing rights only) (2000)
Tech Romancer (European publishing rights only) (2000)
Operation WinBack (European publishing rights only) (2000)
Marvel vs. Capcom 2: New Age of Heroes (European publishing rights only) (2000)
Bomberman Fantasy Race (European publishing rights only) (2000)
Plasma Sword: Nightmare of Bilstein (European publishing rights only) (2000)
Street Fighter III: Double Impact (European publishing rights only) (2000)
Street Fighter Alpha 3 (European publishing rights only) (2000)
Dino Crisis 2 (European publishing rights only) (2000)
Gunlok (Europe only) (2000)
Super Runabout: The Golden State (European publishing rights only) (2000)
Strider 2 (European publishing rights only) (2000)
Giga Wing (European publishing rights only) (2000)
Capcom vs. SNK (European publishing rights only) (2000)
Resident Evil 3: Nemesis (European Dreamcast version only) (2000)
Trick'N Snowboarder (European publishing rights only) (2000)
Jimmy White's 2: Cueball (Distributed in North America by BAM! Entertainment) (2000)
Pocket Racing (European publishing rights only) (2000)
Mr. Driller (Dreamcast and GBC versions, Europe only) (2000)
JoJo's Bizarre Adventure (European publishing rights only) (2000)
Street Fighter III: 3rd Strike (European publishing rights only) (2000)
Evolva (European publishing rights only) (2000)
Project Justice (European publishing rights only) (2000)
Heist (titled as Raub in Germany) (2001)
Gunbird 2 (European publishing rights only) (2001)
European Super League (Europe Only) (2001)
3D Pocket Pool (Europe Only) (2001)
Project Justice: Rival Schools 2 (European publishing rights only) (2001)
Bloody Roar III (European publishing rights only) (2001)
Original War (2001)
Screamer 4x4 (2001)
Codename: Outbreak (2001)
Lotus Challenge (European PS2 version) (2001)
Magic & Mayhem: The Art of Magic (European publishing rights only) (2001)
Jimmy White's Cueball World (Europe exclusive game) (2001)
Resident Evil: Gaiden (European publishing rights only) (2001)
Nightstone (2001)
Guilty Gear X (European publishing rights only) (2002)

Notes

References

External links
 Official website (archived through 2003)
 Avalon Interactive Portal (offline)
 Virgin Interactive profile on MobyGames

Companies based in Orange County, California
Defunct video game companies of the United Kingdom
Golden Joystick Award winners
I
Video game companies established in 1983
Video game companies disestablished in 2006